Sondrestrom may refer to:

 Sondrestrom Air Base, was a U.S. air base in central Greenland
 Sondrestrom (settlement), a settlement in western Greenland
 Sondrestrom Upper Atmospheric Research Facility, a research facility in western Greenland

See also 
 Kangerlussuaq (disambiguation)
 Søndre Strømfjord (disambiguation)